Nikostratos Kalomenopoulos was a Greek revolutionary and Army officer who reached the rank of major general. He is also known by his nom de guerre Kapetan Nidas.

Biography
He was born at Syros in 1865. After studies in the NCO School, he was commissioned an infantry second lieutenant in 1891. In 1892, he went in disguise to Crete, then still under Ottoman rule, and secretly mapped the island, but was discovered, arrested, and expelled. In 1896, he joined the Cretan uprising against the Ottomans and was elected as head of the Amari Province. In 1897, he joined the Greek expeditionary force to the island under Colonel Timoleon Vassos.

In 1905, following the death of Pavlos Melas, he rushed to join the Macedonian Struggle. In Macedonia, he adopted the nom de guerre Kapetan Nidas and became a chieftain of an armed band that operated around Florina. On April 15th, 1905, he and his band were surrounded by a force of 200 Ottoman troops. Following the battle that ensued, several Makedonomachoi were killed or wounded while Kalomenopoulos was captured by the Ottoman authorities and condemned to five years imprisonment at Monastir, but managed to escape three years later. He fought in the Balkan Wars of 1912–1913, being wounded during the Battle of Sarantaporo in 1912.

In 1914–1916 he commanded the Lesbos infantry regiment, and the 3rd Serres Regiment in the Serres Division in 1917. In 1918–19 he commanded the 8th Infantry Division, and in 1919, he served as garrison commander of Smyrna during its occupation by the Hellenic Army. In 1920, he was military governor of Athens, and retired in August 1921.

Apart from his military career, Kalomenopoulos was also the author of a number of topographic, military, and historical studies, including on the military history of the Byzantine Empire. He is considered one of the best military writers in Greece.

He died in Athens in 1952.

References

1865 births
1952 deaths
19th-century Greek military personnel
20th-century Greek military personnel
Greek military personnel of the Balkan Wars
Greek military personnel of the Greco-Turkish War (1897)
Greek military personnel of the Greco-Turkish War (1919–1922)
Greek military personnel of the Macedonian Struggle
Greek military personnel of World War I
Hellenic Army major generals
People from Syros
Prisoners and detainees of the Ottoman Empire
Escapees
20th-century Greek historians
Military historians